is a railway station in the city of  Kanazawa, Ishikawa Prefecture, Japan.

Lines

Station layout
The station consists of one island platform connected to the station building by a footbridge. The station is unmanned.

Platforms

History
It was renamed to its present name on 1 October 1925. With the privatization of Japanese National Railways (JNR) on 1 April 1987, the station came under the control of JR West.

Passenger statistics
In fiscal 2015, the station was used by an average of 2,628 passengers daily (boarding passengers only).

Gallery

Surrounding area
The Hokuriku Railroad Ishikawa Line is also connected to the station with a separate building named Shin-Nishi-Kanazawa Station located on the east side of the JR station.

See also
 List of railway stations in Japan

References

External links

  

Stations of West Japan Railway Company
Railway stations in Ishikawa Prefecture
Railway stations in Japan opened in 1912
Hokuriku Main Line